The City of Kawartha Lakes (2021 population 79,247) is a unitary municipality in Central Ontario, Canada. It is a municipality legally structured as a single-tier city; however, Kawartha Lakes is the size of a typical Ontario county and is mostly rural. It is the second largest single-tier municipality in Ontario by land area (after Greater Sudbury).

The main population centres are the communities of Lindsay (population: 22,367), Bobcaygeon (population: 3,576), Fenelon Falls (population: 2,490), Omemee (population: 1,060) and Woodville (population: 718).

History
The Kawartha Lakes area is situated on the traditional territory of the Anishinaabeg, Huron-Wendat and more recently, the Haudenosaunee peoples. The city's name is from the Kawartha Lakes. Kawartha is an anglicization of Ka-wa-tha (from Ka-wa-tae-gum-maug or Gaa-waategamaag), which was coined in 1895 by Martha Whetung of the Curve Lake First Nations. It meant "land of reflections" in the Anishinaabe language, according to Whetung. The word was later changed by tourism promoters to Kawartha, meaning "bright waters and happy lands."

Prior to its restructuring as a city, the area was known as Victoria County. The city was created in 2001, during the ruling provincial Progressive Conservative party's "Common Sense Revolution". Through provincial legislation, the former Victoria County and its constituent municipalities were amalgamated into one entity named the City of Kawartha Lakes.

This act was implemented by the Victoria County Restructuring Commission, led by commissioner Harry Kitchen. Despite a general opposition from residents of the area, the provincial government pushed forward with the amalgamation, which officially came into effect on January 1, 2001.

By a narrow margin (51% for, 49% against), the citizens of Kawartha Lakes voted to de-amalgamate in a November 2003 local plebiscite, but the provincial and municipal governments have not taken any steps since the vote to initiate de-amalgamation.

Demographics

In the 2016 census, the population of the Lindsay urban area was 20,713, up from 20,291 in 2011.

Ethnicity 
Ethnic Origins 2021

Only ethnic groups that comprise greater than 1% of the population are included. Note that a person can report more than one group

English: 35.9%
Irish: 27.2%
Scottish: 25.5%
Canadian: 20.6%
German: 8.8%
French n.o.s: 7.5%
British Isles n.o.s: 5.8%
Dutch: 5.3%
Italian: 3.4%
Welsh: 3.0%
Polish: 2.5%
Caucasian (White), n.o.s.: 2.1%
Ukrainian: 2.1%
European, n.o.s.: 1.5%
First Nations n.o.s: 1.4%
Métis: 1.1%
French Canadian: 1.0%
In 2021, Kawartha Lakes was 93.7% white/European, 3.4% visible minorities, and 2.9% Indigenous. The largest visible minority groups were South Asian (0.9%), Black (0.8%) and Chinese (0.5%).

Religion 
53.8% of Kawartha Lakes residents were Christian in 2021, down from 68.8% in 2011. 28.3% were Protestant, including 12.7% United Church, 7.0% Anglican, 3.3% Presbytarian and 2.5% Baptist. 15.6% were Catholic, 5.8% were Christian n.o.s, and 4.1% belonged to other Christian denominations or Christian-related traditions. Non-religious and secular residents were 44.5% of the population, up from 30.3% in 2011. 1.7% of the population belonged to other religions and spiritual traditions, up from 0.9% in 2011. The largest non-Christian religion was Hinduism (0.4%).

Government 
Kawartha Lakes is governed by a City Council consisting of the Mayor and one councillor from each of the City's wards. From 2001 to the 2018 election, there were 16 wards and councillors, but this was changed to 8 wards for the 2018 election. The mayor and councillors are elected for four-year terms, as mandated by the Government of Ontario for all municipalities in the province. The mayor of Kawartha Lakes is Doug Elmslie.

For purposes of electing representatives both provincially and federally, the city is within the riding of Haliburton—Kawartha Lakes—Brock. Its Member of Provincial Parliament (MPP) is Laurie Scott of the Progressive Conservative Party, elected in 2018. Its federal Member of Parliament (MP) is Jamie Schmale of the Conservative Party, who was elected in 2015.

Communities
The following is a list of all the former incorporated villages, unincorporated hamlets and communities, rural post offices, and rural post offices abandoned after the start of rural mail delivery.

Ancona Point
Argyle
Aros**
Avery Point
Baddow
Baker Trail
Ballyduff
Barclay
Bellevue
Bethany
Bethel
Birch Point
Bobcaygeon
Bolsover
Brunswick
Burnt River
Burton
Bury's Green
Cambray
Cameron
Camp Kagawong
Campbells Beach
Coboconk
Corson's Siding
Cowan's Bay
Crawfords Beach
Cresswell
Crosshill
Cunningham's Corners
Dalrymple
Dartmoor*
Daytonia Beach
Dongola**
Downeyville
Dunsford
East Emily
Eldon
Fairburn Corner
Fee's Landing
Feir Mill
Fell Station
Fenelon Falls
Fingerboard
Fleetwood*
Fleetwood Station**
Fowlers Corners
Fox's Corners
Frank Hill
Franklin
Gilsons Point
Glamorgan
Glandine
Glenarm
Glenway Village
Grasshill
Greenhurst-Thurstonia
Hartley**
Head Lake**
Hickory Beach
Hillhead Corners
Horncastle*
Isaacs Glen
Islay**
Janetville
Joyvista Estates
Kenedon Park
Kennedy Bay
Kenrei Park
Kenstone Beach
Keystone Beach
King's Wharf
Kinmount
Kirkfield
Lake Dalrymple
Lancaster Bay
Lifford
Linden Valley
Lindsay
Little Britain
Long Beach
Long Point
Lorneville
Lotus
MacKenzie Point
Mallards Bay
Manilla
Manvers
Mariposa Station**
Mariposa
McCrackin's Beach
McGuire Beach
Mount Horeb*, **
Newmans Beach
Norland
Oak Hill
Oakdene Point
Oakwood
O'Donnell Landing
Omemee
Orange Corners
Palestine**
Pickerel Point
Pleasant Point
Pontypool
Port Hoover
Powles Corners
Ragged Rapids*, **
Reaboro
Red Cap Beach
Rohallion
Rokeby
Rosedale
Sadowa
Salem Corners
Sandy Point
Sebright
Silver Lake
Snug Harbour
Southview Estates
St. Mary's**
Sturgeon Point
Sullivan's Bay
Sylvan Glen Beach
Taylor's Corners
Tracey's Hill
Union Creek
Uphill**
Valentia
Verulam Park
Victoria Road
View Lake
Washburn Island
Watson's Siding
Woodville
Yelverton
Zion**

Note:

* ghost town
** abandoned includes: solely a rural post office (no other local "community") abandoned after the start of rural mail delivery; abandoned rural post office with some local community that became ghost town over time; and communities planned during surveying of the county in the 1830s, but were never built

Climate
The Kawartha Lakes area has a humid continental climate with warm, sometimes humid summers and cold snowy winters. The snowier areas are typically the ones closer to large lakes, and snow usually ranges from 150 cm to 200 cm in a year in most areas.

Victoria County

Prior to 2001, Victoria County consisted of 13 separate townships and 6 incorporated communities, each with their own local governments:

Townships

Incorporated Township Name (Population centres):
Bexley (Victoria Road, Coboconk)
Carden (Dalrymple)
Dalton (Sebright, Uphill, Sadowa)
Eldon (Glenarm, Kirkfield, Woodville)
Emily (Omemee, Downeyville, Fowlers Corners)
Fenelon (Cameron, Cambray, Powles Corners)
Laxton, Digby and Longford (Uphill, Norland)
Longford (largely uninhabited)
Manvers (Janetville, Bethany, Pontypool)
Mariposa (Oakwood, Little Britain, Manilla)
Ops (Reaboro)
Somerville (Coboconk, Kinmount)
Verulam (Dunsford, Bobcaygeon)

The township of Laxton, Digby and Longford is an amalgamation of the once individual townships of Digby and Laxton, and half of the original Longford Township. The separate township of Longford is uninhabited, though dotted with abandoned logging towns. In 2000, just prior to amalgamation into the city of Kawartha Lakes, the township of Verulam and the village of Bobcaygeon were amalgamated into the Municipality of Bobcaygeon/Verulam, and the separate townships of Carden and Dalton amalgamated into the Township of Carden/Dalton.

Incorporated communities

Town of Lindsay
Village of Bobcaygeon
Village of Fenelon Falls
Village of Omemee
Village of Sturgeon Point
Village of Woodville

Transportation

Air transportation
Kawartha Lakes Municipal Airport, a Transport Canada certified airport, has 24-hour radio operated lighting and provides access to key points throughout Ontario. Kawartha Lakes Municipal Airport is located one nautical mile west north west of Lindsay. It offers a card lock fuel system and can be used by both private and commercial airplanes.

Water transportation
Towns and villages in City of Kawartha Lakes are interconnected by rivers, lakes and streams that can be best navigated May to October. The Trent-Severn Waterway, which extends from Bay of Quinte on Lake Ontario to Georgian Bay in the north, is part of the waterways in City of Kawartha Lakes. Five locks, Bobcaygeon 32, Lindsay 33, Fenelon Falls 34, Rosedale 35, and Kirkfield 36 are part of the Trent-Severn National HistoricSsite and operated by Parks Canada. Coboconk is noted as being Canada's fresh water summit with waters flowing two different directions. It is the highest navigable point in Canada from which it is possible to reach the world. There are no water taxis operating in City of Kawartha Lakes. Boat and houseboat rentals are available.

Land transportation

The following King's Highways pass through the city:
 Highway 7, part of the Trans-Canada Highway
 Highway 7A
 Highway 35
 Highway 115
Highway 7B also exists entirely within the city, following the length of Kent Street through Lindsay, and cosigning with Highway 35 for 800 m.

The following multi-use trails pass through the city:
  Lindsay-Peterborough (east-west) rail line, part of the Trans Canada Trail
  Bethany-Haliburton (north-south) rail line, known as the Victoria Rail Trail

Public transportation
Because of the largely rural composition of the City of Kawartha Lakes, there is limited public transportation. City of Kawartha Lakes has public bus transit in the town of Lindsay only (known as Lindsay Transit), running three lines of hourly service Monday-Saturday from 7am-7pm.

On June 21, 2015 a pilot project rural bus route serving part of City of Kawartha Lakes ended service. The rural bus stopped in Lindsay, Dunsford, Bobcaygeon, Fenelon Falls, and Cameron.

Most school children are bussed to elementary and high school.

Bus companies
TOK Coachlines (formerly called CanAr Bus Lines) offers service between Toronto and Haliburton with several stops in City of Kawartha Lakes.

Train routes
The last Canadian National Railway (CN) train to run through City of Kawartha Lakes was on the Lindsay - Uxbridge line which ceased operation in 1990. The last passenger train to run through the City of Kawartha Lakes was No. 189 with Budd Car VIA 6104 from Havelock to Toronto Union Station over Canadian Pacific Railway (CP) lines on January 14, 1990.

CP freight trains continue to operate through the City of Kawartha Lakes on the Havelock Subdivision (MP 133.23 - MP 143.22) which passes through Pontypool (MP 139.1)

High-level discussions organized by the Shining Waters Railway continue about returning passenger rail-service to the Midtown Toronto to Havelock line with a stop in Pontypool.

The Trans Canada Trail which is situated on the old rail line from Uxbridge, continues to be a possibility for commuter service to Toronto and Pearson Airport, from the Highway 7 bridge.

Taxi services
There are several private taxi services in City of Kawartha Lakes licensed by the local government.

Car/van pools
Several businesses and organizations offer car and van pooling through Car Pool World  including Sir Sandford Fleming College.

Attractions
Academy Theatre
Lindsay Little Theatre
The Lindsay Gallery
Maryboro Lodge: The Fenelon Museum
Devil's Elbow Ski Area, Bethany
Ganaraska Hiking Trail
Trans-Canada Trail, and Doube's Trestle Bridge
Lindsay Airport, Lindsay
Youngtown Rock and Roll Museum
Olde Gaol Museum
Victoria Recreation Corridor
Highland Cinema and Museum, Kinmount
Trent-Severn Waterway
Lock 32: Bobcaygeon
Lock 33: Lindsay
Lock 34: Fenelon Falls
Lock 35: Rosedale
Lock 36: Kirkfield lift lock

Protected areas
Queen Elizabeth II Wildlands Provincial Park
Carden Alvar Provincial Park
Balsam Lake Provincial Park
Indian Point Provincial Park
Emily Provincial Park
Pigeon River Headwaters Conservation Area
Fleetwood Creek Conservation Area
Windy Ridge Conservation Area
Ken Reid Conservation Area
Gamiing Nature Centre

Media
 Kawartha Lakes This Week (established as Lindsay This Week in 1977)
 The Lindsay Advocate (online and print news magazine focused on social and economic issues.)
 The Kawartha Promoter (online news magazine published out of Bobcaygeon)
 91.9 Bounce FM (CKLY-FM) transmits from Lindsay
 CHEX-TV transmits on Channel 12 from Peterborough
 100.3 LIFE FM, transmitting at 89.3 from Peterborough
 The Lindsay Post (established in Beaverton as The Canadian Post in 1857, moved to Lindsay in 1861. Ceased publication in 2013.)

Surrounding counties
Muskoka District Municipality
Haliburton County
Northumberland County
Peterborough County
Regional Municipality of Durham
Simcoe County

See also 
 List of secondary schools in Ontario#City of Kawartha Lakes

Notes

References

External links

 
2001 establishments in Ontario
Cities in Ontario
Populated places established in 2001
Single-tier municipalities in Ontario